Parliamentary elections were held in Zaire on 6 September 1987. The Popular Movement of the Revolution was the sole political party at the time, with all candidates running for election to the Legislative Council required to be party members. In total, 1,075 candidates ran for the 210 seats (reduced from 310 in the previous election).

Results
Of the 210 elected candidates, 198 were men and 12 were women.

References

Elections in the Democratic Republic of the Congo
1987 in Zaire
One-party elections
Zaire
Election and referendum articles with incomplete results